IAPM  may refer to:

 IAPM (mode), a mode of operation for cryptographic block ciphers
 Indian Association of Pathologists and Microbiologists
 Irish Association of Physicists in Medicine 
 IAPM Mall, shopping mall in Shanghai, China